was a Japanese dramatist, translator, and literary critic. From 1969 until 1983, he was a professor at Kyoto Sangyo University. He became a member of the Japan Art Academy in 1981.

His criticism of the pacifist Japanese establishment of the early post-Second World War era earned him early notoriety, though he is most well-known for his translations of William Shakespeare's oeuvre into Japanese, starting with Hamlet in 1955. He was a frequent contributor to conservative magazines, such as Bungeishunjū, Shokun, and Jiyū. Called a "rhetorician", and a "conjuror of controversy", he frequently used cognitive reframing in his discourse.

Life
Tsuneari Fukuda was born to Kōshirō and Masa Fukuda on 25 August 1912 in the Hongō ward (now part of the Bunkyō special ward) of Tokyo. His name "Tsuneari" was chosen by novelist Ishibashi Shian, and originates from the works of the Chinese philosopher Mencius. He attended Tokyo Imperial University, where he studied English literature, graduating in 1936. His graduate thesis was entitled "Ethical issues in the works of D. H. Lawrence".

After graduating, Fukuda worked as a secondary school teacher and a publisher. He began his long career as a literary critic with a contribution to the Kōdō bungaku literary magazine in 1937, the article entitled "Riichi Yokomitsu and The Author's Secret". Before and just after the Second World War, he wrote critiques of the works of Ryūnosuke Akutagawa, Isota Kamura, and other modern Japanese writers. In 1947, Fukuda's article Ippiki to kyūjūhiki to (一匹と九十九匹), published in the Shisaku magazine, stirred up controversy about the dividing line between literature and politics, and later came to be seen as one of his representative works. From 1949, he participated in the Japanese–British cultural exchange group "Albion Club" (あるびよん・くらぶ). From 1950 onward, Fukuda's interest shifted away from general literary criticism and critiques of individual writers. Representative works from this period include Geijutsu to wa nanika (藝術とは何か; lit. 'What is Art?'), published in 1950, and Ningen, kono gekiteki naru mono (人間・この劇的なるもの; lit. 'Man, this dramatic being') published in 1956.

What made Fukuda famous, however, was his status as a lone conservative voice amidst a flourishing of progressive thought in post-Second World War Japan. In his 1954 article Heiwaron no susumekata ni tsuite no gimon (平和論の進め方についての疑問; lit. 'Doubts about the advancement of the pacifist theory'), he criticised the pacifism that had become dominant in Japan. Furthermore, he was a strong critic of the post-war reforms to the Japanese language, and in 1955–56, he participated in a public debate with advocates of those reforms, led by Kyōsuke Kindaichi, in which he pointed out what he saw as the illogical nature of the Tōyō kanji list and modern kana usage. On this subject, he released the book Watashi no kokugokyōshitsu (私の國語教室; lit. 'My Japanese language classroom') in 1960, where he advocated for the reversal of the post-war Japanese script reforms, which he argued were irrational and destructive, the preservation of historical kana usage and the abolition of restrictions on the usage of kanji. Fukuda himself never adopted the style mandated by the reforms, writing in historical kana and traditional kanji, though some publishing houses converted his writing into modern usage after his death.

His representative works as a literary translator include Shakespeare's Macbeth, Hamlet, Richard III and A Midsummer Night's Dream, Ernest Hemingway's The Old Man and the Sea, and Oscar Wilde's Salome and The Picture of Dorian Gray.

In the 1950s, Fukuda also wrote and produced plays, including Kitty Typhoon and also The Man Who Stroked a Dragon. He was linked to Shingeki, and in 1955 he did a production of Hamlet with Hiroshi Akutagawa, son of Ryūnosuke Akutagawa, playing the lead role. He also wrote a 1957 essay Directing Shakespeare, which dealt with his views on the subject of directing Shakespearean plays. Later he did a Japanese version, based on his translation, of A Midsummer Night's Dream. In addition, he helped found the Kumo Theatre Company (present-day Theatre Company Subaru) and received the Yomiuri Prize multiple times.

He died at the age of 82 from complications related to pneumonia at Tōkai University Ōiso Hospital on 20 November 1994.

See also
Fukuzawa Yukichi
Nakae Chōmin
Natsume Sōseki
Susumu Nishibe
Yamamoto Tsunetomo

References 

English–Japanese translators
Japanese dramatists and playwrights
Japanese theatre directors
Translators of William Shakespeare
Japanese literary critics
Yomiuri Prize winners
1912 births
1994 deaths
20th-century Japanese translators
20th-century poets